Mahicon José Librelato da Silva, (March 30, 1981 – November 28, 2002) was a Brazilian footballer.

Mahicon died when his car crashed in Florianópolis, in 2002.

A rising star when playing for Internacional, he was of great importance due to his goal scoring skills that helped Inter escape relegation in the 2002 edition of Campeonato Brasileiro, making colorados remember him fondly for his dedication and affection for the club. His image sobbing and crying after the decisive game against Paysandu Sport Club is one of the most famous of Inter's recent history

Career 
Criciúma: 1997 - 2001.
Internacional: 2002.

Team awards 
Rio Grande do Sul State Championship - 2002 - Internacional

References

1981 births
2002 deaths
Brazilian footballers
Sport Club Internacional players
Road incident deaths in Brazil
Association football forwards
Sportspeople from Santa Catarina (state)